Angharad Llwyd (15 April 1780 – 16 October 1866) was a Welsh antiquary and a prizewinner at the National Eisteddfod of Wales. She is generally considered one of the most important collectors and copiers of manuscripts of the period.

Biography

Llwyd was born at Caerwys in Flintshire, the daughter of the local rector, Rev. John Lloyd, himself a noted antiquary. Her essay entitled Catalogue of Welsh Manuscripts, etc. in North Wales won a prize at the Welshpool eisteddfod of 1824. In 1827 Llwyd edited a revised version of Sir John Wynn's History of the Gwydir Family and in the following year, she was among those awarded silver medals by Prince Augustus Frederick, Duke of Sussex, on his visit to the eisteddfod at Denbigh. She won another first prize at the Beaumaris eisteddfod of 1833.

Works
History of the Island of Mona (1832)

Sources

1780 births
1866 deaths
18th-century Welsh people
18th-century Welsh women
19th-century antiquarians
19th-century Welsh historians
19th-century Welsh women writers
Welsh antiquarians
Members of the Cambrian Archaeological Association
Welsh Eisteddfod winners
People from Caerwys
Welsh women historians